Pantacordis klimeschi is a moth in the family Autostichidae. It was described by László Anthony Gozmány in 1957. It is found on Sicily.

References

Moths described in 1957
Pantacordis